Marcey Lynn Waters is the Glen H. Elder Jr., Distinguished Professor of Chemistry at the University of North Carolina, Chapel Hill (UNC-CH). She is an organic chemist whose research is at the interface of chemical biology and supramolecular chemistry. Waters has received multiple awards, for research, teaching, and advocating for women in science. She is serving the President of the American Peptide Society from 2017 to 2019.

Education 
Waters graduated from the University of California, San Diego with a degree in chemistry in 1992. While an undergraduate, she worked with Prof. Charles L. Perrin studying fundamental aspects of aromaticity. Waters entered the University of Chicago for her doctoral degree in chemistry, working with Prof. William D. Wulff  studying the mechanism for the Wulff-Dotz benzannulation reaction between Fischer carbene complexes. and alkynes. Walters graduated from Chicago in 1997 with a PhD in chemistry. She was an NIH postdoctoral fellow in Prof. Ronald Breslow's group from 1997 to 1999, where she worked on dinuclear metalloenzyme mimics and antiaromaticity.

Research 

Waters joined UNC-Chapel Hill as an assistant professor in 1999. As of 2018, she is the Glen H. Elder, Jr. Distinguished Professor. Waters' research began with studies of non-covalent interactions in peptide beta-hairpin model systems, specifically, how pi-pi and cation-pi system interactions could influence peptide folding and function. This research can also extend to molecular recognition, in which specific peptide cavities can be designed to "host" selected organic molecules. Waters' group also studies protein and peptide methylation patterns and their biophysical interactions, which can relate to epigenetic disease mechanisms. She collaborated with faculty colleague Nancy Albritton to study degrons of proteolytically cleaved ubiquitins.

Volunteer service

Mentorship 
Waters was involved in mentorship of chemistry students from nontraditional and disadvantaged backgrounds as part of the American Chemical Society's Project SEED. She has advanced multiple campus groups encouraging women scholars in physical sciences. Waters mentored for TANDEMplusIDEA, the international mentoring program for female scientists from 2007 to 2009. Waters was on the board of directors for the Mesilla Chemistry Workshop held in July from 2006 to 2018. From 2011 to 2013, Waters was a UNC WOWS Scholar (Working on Women in Science). From 2013 to 2018, she was a Faculty Advisor for UNC WISE (Women in Science and Engineering, graduate student organization).

Journal and conference boards 
In 2007, Waters served as co-chair for the International Symposium on Dynamic Combinatorial Chemistry (November). The year after that, she was an Advisory Board Member of International Symposia on Macrocyclic and Supramolecular Chemistry (ISMSC). In 2009, she was a guest editor for the December issue of Current Opinion in Chemical Biology. From 2009 to 2015, she was an Advisory Board Member of International Symposia on Macrocyclic and Supramolecular Chemistry (ISMSC). In 2011, Waters was a Co-Organizer of the Mesilla Chemistry Workshop on “Aromatic Interactions in Chemistry and Biology”(with Ken Houk, UCLA Dept of Chemistry). In 2012, Waters was a Section Editor for “Supramolecular Chemistry: From Molecules to Nanomaterials” (John Wiley and Sons). In 2013, she was the co-chair, of American Peptide Society Meeting (with David Lawrence, UNC Dept of Chemistry) and a guest editor for Accounts of Chemical Research for the “Aromatic Interactions in Chemistry and Biology” article in the April Issue.

From 2014 to 2020, Waters was an Editorial Advisory Board Member of the Journal of the American Chemical Society.

Awards and honors 

 2017 - Elected President of the American Peptide Society.
 2018 - UNC University Award for the Advancement of Women 
 2017 - Fellow, American Association for the Advancement of Science 
 2015 - Mary Turner Lane Award, UNC 
 2014 - Tanner Award for Excellence in Undergraduate Teaching 
 2004 - Alfred P. Sloan Fellowship 
 2000 - NSF Career Award  
 1995-1996 - ACS Organic Division Research Fellowship 
 1992 - GAANN Fellow, Phi Beta Kappa 
 1991 - Howard Hughes Honors Research Fellowship (UCSD) and the NSF REU Fellowship (Columbia University)

References 

Living people
21st-century American chemists
University of North Carolina at Chapel Hill faculty
University of California, San Diego alumni
University of Chicago alumni
American women chemists
Year of birth missing (living people)
21st-century American women scientists
Fellows of the American Association for the Advancement of Science
Sloan Research Fellows
Peptides
American women academics